Brickellia cuspidata is a Mexican species of flowering plants in the family Asteraceae. It is native to western Mexico in the states of Nayarit and Jalisco.

References

External links
Photo of herbarium specimen at Missouri Botanical Garden , type specimen of Brickellia cuspidata

cuspidata
Flora of Mexico
Plants described in 1887